Entoloma cetratum is a common, inedible mushroom of the genus Entoloma. It is mostly found from May, in coniferous forest, among moss.

Description
The cap is broadly conical to convex, light amber-brown, ribbed, and grows up to 3 cm in diameter. It is ribbed almost to the centre.
The gills are salmon pink and sinuate. The spores are pink. The stem is light brown, longitudinally fibrous and slender.

See also
List of Entoloma species

References
E. Garnweidner. Mushrooms and Toadstools of Britain and Europe. Collins. 1994.

External links
 
 

Entolomataceae
Fungi of Europe
Taxa named by Elias Magnus Fries